Lehmannia macroflagellata is species of air-breathing land slug, a shell-less terrestrial pulmonate gastropod mollusk in the family Limacidae.

Distribution and habitat
This species lives in woodland.

It is not listed in the IUCN red list; it was not evaluated (NE) 

It is found in countries and islands including:
 Czech Republic
 Slovakia
 Poland
 Ukraine
 and others

References

External links 
 Photo of the species

Limacidae
Gastropods described in 1962